La Storia ("History") is a 1986 Italian drama film directed by Luigi Comencini and starring Claudia Cardinale. It is based on the 1974 novel of the same name written by Elsa Morante. A shorter version of the film was  released theatrically, while a 4 hours and a half version was broadcast in three parts on Rai 2 in December 1986. It premiered out of competition at the 43rd Venice International Film Festival, where Cardinale refused to appear, upset because the film  had not been selected in the main competition.

Plot

Cast 
Claudia Cardinale as Ida
Francisco Rabal as Remo
 Andrea Spada as Useppe
 Antonio Degli Schiavi as Nino
Lambert Wilson as Carlo/ Davide
Fiorenzo Fiorentini as Cucchiarelli
Tobias Hoesl as Günther 
 Caroline Lang as Anita
 Anna Recchimuzzi as Mercedes
 Maria Teresa Albani as Wilma
 Silvana De Santis as Santina

See also 
List of Italian films of 1986

References

External links

Italian drama films
1986 drama films
1986 films
Italian World War II films
Films set in Rome
Films directed by Luigi Comencini
Films based on Italian novels
Films with screenplays by Suso Cecchi d'Amico
Films scored by Fiorenzo Carpi
1980s Italian films